The  is the freight only railway company in Miyagi Prefecture, Japan. The third sector company was founded in 1970. Its lines transport containers or petroleum between Tōhoku Main Line and the industrial area of Port of Sendai. The lines were damaged by the 2011 Great East Japan earthquake and returned to service in 2012.

Lines
Rinkai Main Line (臨海本線, "Seaside Main Line") opened 1971
Rikuzan-Sannō — Sendai-Kitakō: 5.4 km / 3.3 mi.
Sendai Futō Line (仙台埠頭線 "Sendai Pier Line") opened 1975
Sendaikō — Sendai-Futō: 1.6 km / 1.0 mi.
Sendai Nishikō Line (仙台西港線 "Sendai West Port Line") opened 1983
Sendaikō — Sendai-Nishikō: 2.0 km / 1.2 mi.

See also
List of railway companies in Japan

References
This article incorporates material from the corresponding article in the Japanese Wikipedia

External links 
 Official website

Railway companies of Japan
Rail transport in Miyagi Prefecture
Railway companies established in 1970